Jesuit High School may refer to:
 Jesuit High School (Sacramento), California
 Jesuit High School (Tampa), Florida
 Jesuit High School (New Orleans), Louisiana
 Jesuit High School (Beaverton, Oregon)
 Jesuit College Preparatory School of Dallas, called Jesuit High School before 1969

See also 
 List of Jesuit secondary schools